William Henry Holmes Lyons  (31 July 1843 – 27 March 1924) was the High Sheriff of Antrim in 1904. He was a political leader who fought to maintain the union between Great Britain and Northern Ireland.

He was born in Belfast and educated at Harrow School and in France. He intended to pursue a military career and passed his examinations with distinction, but owing to defective eyesight (he lost an eye playing rackets at Harrow) he was unable to enter the Army. Mr Lyons became a prominent Unionist.

He was a member of the Orange Institution and in December 1915, he was promoted to the position of Sovereign Grand Master of the Orange Lodge of Ireland. For fifty years he was a prominent member of the Black Institution. He was also Grand Master of the Imperial Grand Black Chapter of the British Commonwealth.

Mr Lyons was appointed a Privy Councillor in Ireland in 1922.

Mr Lyons married in 1888 a daughter of Geoffrey Evans of Gortmerron House in County Tyrone. He had three daughters and a son who died on 1 November 1918 from influenza contracted in World War I.

According to the Belfast News, a memorial service took place at St Anne’s Cathedral, Belfast on 27 March 1924. His death was reported around the British Empire.

References

External links 

 

1843 births
1924 deaths
People educated at Harrow School
Grand Masters of the Orange Order
High Sheriffs of Antrim
Members of the Privy Council of Ireland